The Novo  (formerly Club Nokia) is an indoor club located at L.A. Live in downtown Los Angeles, California. The club's seating capacity is 2,400.

History
The venue opened on November 8, 2008, as "Club Nokia" with shows held by the musician Beck over the first two nights. Its name was changed in March 2016, several months after the neighboring Nokia Theater's name was changed to the Microsoft Theater. The theater continues to be booked by Goldenvoice.

Name
Club Nokia 
The Novo

Concerts

See also
 Microsoft Theater
 L.A. Live
 List of music venues in Los Angeles
 List of music venues

References

External links
 
 The Novo's Google+ Page

L.A. Live
Music venues in Los Angeles
Nightclubs in Los Angeles County, California
Music venues completed in 2008
Los Angeles Valiant
Esports venues in California